Annunciation (or The Virgin Mary) is a panel painting by the German artist Stefan Lochner (c. 1410 – 1451), whose panels were probably conceived as outer wing for a lost altarpiece. It shows the virgin, rather conventionally receiving the voice of the holy spirit, who hovers above her in the form of a dove. A vase behind her holds a lily. Her white clothes and the flower represent her virginity. It seems influenced by similar panels found in Jan van Eyck's Ghent Altarpiece.

References

Notes

Sources

 Chapuis, Julien. Stefan Lochner: Image Making in Fifteenth-Century Cologne. Turnhout: Brepols, 2004.  
 Wellesz, Emmy; Rothenstein, John (ed). Stephan Lochner. London: Fratelli Fabbri, 1963

Paintings by Stefan Lochner
1430s paintings
Collections of the Wallraf–Richartz Museum
Lochner
Birds in art
Books in art